The Roanoke Valley-Alleghany Regional Commission (RVARC, founded in 1969, is one of 21 Virginia Planning District Commissions.  The Regional Commission is not a State Agency, but was established by its member governments through a charter agreement under Virginia law as a political subdivision of the Commonwealth. The Regional Commission serves the governments, businesses, and citizens of the region.

The Commission's board is composed of 36 representatives appointed by its member local governments. Board representation also includes non-voting liaison members representing chambers of commerce, economic development organizations and community colleges.

The commission promotes regional cooperation and provides support to member localities in transportation planning, environmental planning, land use planning, comprehensive planning, GIS and economic development.  As a State Data Center Affiliate, the commission also provides demographic data services.

Local governments are allowed to become members of more than one planning district.  Franklin County and the Town of Rocky Mount are designated as part of the West Piedmont Planning District Commission, but they are also members of the Roanoke Valley-Alleghany Regional Commission.

The Commission was known as the Fifth Planning District Commission, but changed its name to the Roanoke Valley-Alleghany Regional Commission in 1999.

Commission funding varies from year to year. Funding is obtained from multiple federal state and local sources.

The commission also staffs the Roanoke Valley Area Metropolitan Planning Organization which is a federally designated Metropolitan Planning Organization.  The commission also staffs a regional program known as RIDE Solutions which supports and promotes sustainable transport activities such as ridesharing, transit, biking and pedestrian mobility.

Member Governments
Alleghany County, Virginia
Botetourt County, Virginia
Craig County, Virginia
Franklin County, Virginia
Roanoke County, Virginia
City of Covington, Virginia
City of Roanoke, Virginia
City of Salem, Virginia
Clifton Forge, Virginia
Rocky Mount, Virginia
Vinton, Virginia

References

External links
 Roanoke Valley-Alleghany Regional Commission
 Roanoke Valley Area Metropolitan Planning Organization
 RIDE Solutions

Government of Virginia